The 1926–27 season of Atromitos F.C. was the 4th in the club's history and the third season that the club were participating in the Athens Football Clubs Association League.

The chairman of the team was Andreas Tsouroutsoylou, the person that created the club.

Athens Football Clubs Association League

Competition: The league was conducted in one group, from which the top four teams would proceed to the final phase. The final phase was a single round-robin tournament, from which the team that finished first would be declared champions.

Atromitos made it to the final phase by finishing 3rd in the starting group, but came 3rd in the final phase as well, losing the title.

Qualification round

Table

Matches

Final round

Table

Matches

References

"Flutter in Glory" by Pavlos Katonis

1926-27
Greek football clubs 1926–27 season